Coupon is an unincorporated community in Cambria County, Pennsylvania, United States.

History
The community was originally a company town, and its name is derived from the practice of paying employees in scrip, or coupons.

Geography
Coupon is located in the northeastern part of Gallitzin Township near the eastern border of Cambria County at the crest of the Allegheny Front, the eastern edge of the Allegheny Plateau.

Demographics
As of 2010, the Coupon ZIP code area had a population of 73.

Recreation
Coupon is within hiking distance of the Horseshoe Curve, and hikers are rewarded with a unique view of the National Historic Landmark that is not otherwise accessible from the visitors' center.

References

Unincorporated communities in Cambria County, Pennsylvania
Unincorporated communities in Pennsylvania